The ninth series of Made in Chelsea, a British structured-reality television programme, began airing on 13 April 2015 on E4. This series also featured the show's 100th episode; broadcast on 15 June 2015. This series was the first series to include new cast members Emily Weller, Jess Woodley, Millie Wilkinson, Fleur Irving, Josh "JP" Patterson, Nicola Hughes, James Dunmore and Elliot Cross, and the last to include long running cast members Andy Jordan and Stevie Johnson, as well as Sophie Hermann, Fran Newman-Young and Lauren Frazer-Hutton. The series focused on blossoming relationships between James and Lucy, and Jamie and Jess, a rift forming between Lucy and Stephanie, and Spencer's romance with Lauren hitting the rocks when he turns back to his old ways.

Cast

Episodes

{| class="wikitable plainrowheaders" style="width:100%; background:white;"
|- style="color:black"
! style="background: #FF5A83;"| SeriesNo.
! style="background: #FF5A83;"| EpisodeNo.
! style="background: #FF5A83;"| Title
! style="background: #FF5A83;"| Original airdate
! style="background: #FF5A83;"| Duration
! style="background: #FF5A83;"| UK viewers

|}

Ratings

External links

References

2015 British television seasons
Made in Chelsea seasons